The Rat River Formation is a geologic formation in Northwest Territories. It preserves fossils dating back to the Cretaceous period.

See also 
 List of fossiliferous stratigraphic units in Northwest Territories

References

External links 
 

Cretaceous Northwest Territories
Aptian Stage